Boardman is an unincorporated community in St. Croix County, Wisconsin located just southwest of New Richmond on County Road A, in the town of Richmond.

History
Boardman was named in 1853 for C. A. Boardman, an early settler. A post office called Boardman was established in 1862, and remained in operation until it was discontinued in 1954.

References

Unincorporated communities in St. Croix County, Wisconsin
Unincorporated communities in Wisconsin